This is the list of cathedrals in the Philippines sorted by denomination.

Roman Catholic

The Catholic Church in the Philippines is organized into 72 dioceses in 16 Ecclesiastical Provinces, as well as 7 Apostolic Vicariates and a Military Ordinariate.

Cathedrals of the Roman Catholic Church in the Philippines:

Philippine Independent Church

Below is a list of cathedrals of the Philippine Independent Church (Iglesia Filipina Independiente), also known as the Aglipayan Church:

Under the Supreme Bishop

 National Cathedral of the Holy Child in Ermita, Manila
 Cathedral of St. Louis Beltran in Solano, Nueva Vizcaya
 Cathedral of Our Lady of Peace and Good Voyage in Iloilo City
 Pro-Cathedral of Sts. Peter and Paul in Puerto Princesa
 Cathedral of St. Joseph the Worker in Delfin Albano
 Cathedral of St. James the Greater in Santiago, Isabela
 Cathedral of St. Stephen in San Esteban, Ilocos Sur
 Pro-Cathedral of St. Joseph in Gasan, Marinduque

North-Central Luzon Bishops' Conference

 Cathedral of St. William the Hermit in Laoag
 Cathedral of Saint Mary, Aglipay National Shrine in Batac
 Pro-Cathedral of St. William in Ballesteros, Cagayan
 Pro-Cathedral of St. Joseph, SBVM in Lingayen
 Cathedral of Immaculate Conception in Victoria, Tarlac
 Cathedral of St. Anthony of Padua in Rosales, Pangasinan
 Pro-Cathedral of St. Jerome in Santo Domingo, Nueva Ecija
 Cathedral Church of San Roque (St. Roche) in San Felipe, Zambales
 Pro-Cathedral Parish of St. Michael Archangel (Doña Maria Clara Memorial Church) in Camiling
 Pro-Cathedral Parish of St. Augustine of Hippo in Paoay

South-Central Luzon Bishops' Conference

 Cathedral of Immaculate Conception in Malolos
 Cathedral of the Holy Child (Sto. Niño) in Mandaluyong
 Cathedral of the Crucified Lord in Quezon City
 Cathedral of St. Michael and All Archangels in Bacoor
 Cathedral of Our Lady of Maulawin in Santa Cruz, Laguna
 Cathedral of St. Vincent Ferrer in Odiongan, Romblon
 Cathedral of Our Lady of Remedies in Placer, Masbate
 Pro-Cathedral Parish of St. Joseph in Sariaya
 Pro-Cathedral Parish of the Holy Child in Roxas, Oriental Mindoro
 Cathedral Parish of the Holy Child (Sto. Niño) in Pandacan, Manila

Visayas Bishops' Conference

 Cathedral of the Holy Child (Sto. Niño) in Cebu City
 Cathedral Church of St. Joseph the Worker in Tagbilaran
 Cathedral of St. Jude Thaddeus in Sibalom
 Cathedral of Our Lady of Providence and Guidance in Numancia, Aklan
 Cathedral of St. James the Apostle in Padre Burgos, Southern Leyte
 Cathedral of Our Lady of Peace and Good Voyage in Almeria, Biliran
 Cathedral of the Holy Trinity in Calbayog
 Cathedral of St. John the Baptist in Bago, Negros Occidental
 Cathedral of St. Andrew the Apostle in Dumaguete
 Cathedral of Our Lady of Salvation in Buenavista, Guimaras
 Pro-Cathedral of St. Joseph in Candijay
 Pro-Cathedral Parish of Our Lady of the Most Holy Rosary in New Washington, Aklan
 Pro-Cathedral Parish of St. Michael and All Angels in Culasi

Mindanao Bishops' Conference

 Cathedral Church of St. Mary in Ozamiz
 Cathedral of St. Luke, the Apostle and Physician in Pagadian
 Cathedral of St. James, the Lord's Brother and the Just in Tubod, Lanao del Norte
 Cathedral of St. Mary in Oroquieta
 Metropolitan Cathedral of Jesus the Nazarene in Cagayan de Oro
 Cathedral of St. Matthew in Libertad, Misamis Oriental
 Cathedral of the Transfiguration in Malaybalay
 Cathedral of the Transfiguration in Surigao City
 Cathedral of the Holy Child in Dapa, Surigao del Norte
 Cathedral of the Blessed Virgin Mary in Dinagat, Dinagat Islands
 Cathedral of Our Lady of Presentation in Cabadbaran
 Cathedral of St. Joseph, SBVM in Cortes, Surigao del Sur
 Cathedral of the Risen Lord in Davao City
 Cathedral of the Holy Trinity in Koronadal
 Pro-Cathedral Parish of St. Anthony of Padua in Poblacion, Koronadal
 Pro-Cathedral Parish of the Virgin Mary in Bulua, Cagayan de Oro
 Pro-Cathedral Parish of the Ascension of the Lord in Kabacan
 Pro-Cathedral Parish of St. John the Baptist in Bula, General Santos

Overseas Bishops' Conference

 Cathedral of Jesus of Nazareth in 14322 North Blvd., Tampa, Florida, U.S.A. 33613
 Cathedral Parish of the Holy Child in 6301 W. Olympic Blvd., Los Angeles, California

Episcopal Church

Cathedrals of the Episcopal Church in the Philippines, part of the Anglican Communion:
 Cathedral of the Resurrection in Baguio
 Pro-Cathedral of St. Stephen's Parish in Manila
 Cathedral Church of St. Peter & St. Paul in Cotabato City
 All Saints Cathedral in Bontoc, Mountain Province
 Church of the Holy Trinity in Tabuk, Kalinga
 Cathedral of St. Mary and St. John, the national cathedral, in Quezon City

See also
List of cathedrals
Christianity in the Philippines

References

Cathedrals in the Philippines
Philippines
Cathedrals
Cathedrals